The neriad horseshoe bat (Rhinolophus nereis) is a species of bat in the family Rhinolophidae.

It is endemic to Siantan Island of the Anambas Islands, and to the North Natuna Islands, west of Borneo in the South China Sea within Indonesia. Nothing is known about the ecology or total population size of the species.

References

Rhinolophidae
Bats of Indonesia
Bat, Neriad horseshoe
Bat, Neriad horseshoe
Bat, Neriad horseshoe
Taxa named by Knud Andersen
Taxonomy articles created by Polbot